Dattatreya Mukherjee (born 8 February 1965) is an Indian former cricketer. He played twenty-one first-class matches for Bengal between 1987 and 1992.

See also
 List of Bengal cricketers

References

External links
 

1965 births
Living people
Indian cricketers
Bengal cricketers
Cricketers from Kolkata